Chenzhou West railway station is a railway station of Wuhan–Guangzhou High-Speed Railway located in Beihu District, Chenzhou, Hunan, China. It started construction in 2006 and was in operation on 26 December 2009.

Railway stations in China opened in 2009
Railway stations in Hunan
Chenzhou
Stations on the Wuhan–Guangzhou High-Speed Railway